Tarcísio Meirelles Padilha (17 April 1928 – 9 September 2021) was a Brazilian philosopher and chairman of the Brazilian Academy of Letters. He was born in Rio de Janeiro, Brazil, on 17 April 1928, the son of Raymundo Delmiriano Padilha and D. Mayard Meirelles Padilha. In 1951, he married Ruth Maria Fortuna Padilha, and the couple has six children.

Biography
Padilha did his schooling at the Grupo Escolar D. Pedro II in Petrópolis, the Colégio Nossa Senhora Auxiliadora in Campinas and the Colégio Santo Inácio. He obtained a BA in Philosophy and Law from the Pontifical Catholic University of Rio de Janeiro. He also studied at the Escola Superior de Guerra and the Universidade Federal Fluminense. He obtained his PhD in Philosophy from the State University of Rio de Janeiro. He has taught Philosophy at the State University of Rio de Janeiro (where he served as head of department), the Pontifical Catholic University of Rio de Janeiro, the Universidade Santa Úrsula, the Federal University of Rio de Janeiro, and the Universidade Gama Filho. He was a member of the permanent administrative body of the Escola Superior de Guerra.

He was the fifth occupant of Chair 2 of the Brazilian Academy of Letters, to which he was elected on 20 March 1997, in succession to Mário Palmério. He was received on 13 June 1997 by academic Arnaldo Niskier. He in turn received the academics Ana Maria Machado, Luiz Paulo Horta and Marco Lucchesi. He chaired the Brazilian Academy of Letters in 2000 and 2001.

Padilha died from COVID-19 in Rio de Janeiro on 9 September 2021, during the COVID-19 pandemic in Brazil.

References

1928 births
2021 deaths
Brazilian philosophers
Patrons of the Brazilian Academy of Letters
Pontifical Catholic University of Rio de Janeiro alumni
Rio de Janeiro State University alumni
Fluminense Federal University alumni
Academic staff of the Pontifical Catholic University of Rio de Janeiro
Academic staff of the Rio de Janeiro State University
Academic staff of Universidade Santa Úrsula
Academic staff of Universidade Gama Filho
Academic staff of the Federal University of Rio de Janeiro
People from Rio de Janeiro (city)
Deaths from the COVID-19 pandemic in Rio de Janeiro (state)